Haberfield may refer to:

 Graham Haberfield (1941–1975), actor
 Jake Haberfield (born 1986), cricketer
 Haberfield, New South Wales